Henry Cejudo (born February 9, 1987) is an American professional mixed martial artist and freestyle wrestler. He is the former Ultimate Fighting Championship (UFC) Flyweight Champion and Bantamweight Champion. He is the fourth UFC fighter to hold titles in two different weight classes simultaneously, and the second to defend titles in two different weight divisions. He is the only person to win an Olympic gold medal and a UFC title. He is considered to be among the greatest combat athletes of all time due to his accomplishments in MMA and freestyle wrestling.

During his wrestling career, Cejudo competed at 55 kilograms and became the youngest American Olympic Gold medalist in wrestling at the 2008 Summer Olympics at age 21. He was also the 2007 Pan American Games champion, as well as a multiple–time Pan American Continental and US National champion.

On May 9, 2020, Cejudo announced his retirement from professional fighting immediately after a successful title defense against Dominick Cruz. In April 2022, Cejudo announced he was coming back to fight, and his next bout was eventually scheduled for May 6, 2023.

Background
Born to Mexican immigrants Jorge Cejudo and Nelly Rico in Los Angeles, California, Henry Cejudo is the second youngest of the family's seven siblings. As a result of his violent father's drug and alcohol abuse, Cejudo's family constantly moved around the Los Angeles area.

Four-year-old Henry and the rest of the children with her, Nelly fled to New Mexico before Jorge — who was jailed after threatening to kill his whole family and subsequently getting into an altercation in the street — was released. Jorge was deported when Cejudo was six years old and died when Cejudo was about 20 years old. After a couple of years in New Mexico, the family relocated to Phoenix, Arizona. In Phoenix, the family lived in Maryvale in poverty despite their mother working multiple jobs to make the ends meet.

Cejudo also never slept alone in his own bed until he was provided one by USA Wrestling while participating in a residency program at the US Olympic Training Center in Colorado. Henry also started competing as an amateur boxer, and won the annual state Copper Gloves boxing tournament in 2010 in Phoenix, Arizona.

Cejudo enrolled at Grand Canyon University in 2010 and graduated in 2015 with a degree in Theology.

Wrestling career

Early career 
Inspired by his older brother Angel Cejudo, who was an undefeated four-time AIA state champion with a record of 150 wins and zero defeats, Henry also became a four-timer. His freshman and sophomore year titles were won in Arizona, before he moved to Colorado Springs, Colorado, to become a resident athlete at the United States Olympic Training Center. He won the Colorado state championships (CHSAA) as a junior and senior, and was named ASICS National High School Wrestler of the Year in 2006. In the same year, he was selected in the USA Wrestling Magazine's Dream Team of High School All-Americans.

In 2006, Cejudo won the Fargo National title in freestyle. Soon after his victory, he began full-time training at the United States Olympic Training Center in Colorado Springs, Colorado. There, he prepared for the Junior World Championships; after a fifth-place finish in 2005, Cejudo was able to claim the silver medal for the United States of America. He opted to pursue an international career rather than competing in college.

Senior level

2005–2007 
Cejudo made his senior level debut on October 23, 2005, at the Sunkist Open, at the age of 18. He earned notable victories over NCAA champion Jason Powell and three-time All-American Tanner Gardner before finishing fifth. On April 15, 2006, he won the US National Championship at 55 kilograms, qualifying for the US World Team Trials and becoming the first high schooler to do so since the organization (USAW) was established as the sport's governing body in 1983. At the WTT, he defeated an eventual accomplished wrestler in Franklin Gómez in the opening match of the Challenge Tournament before making it to the best-of-three finals. There, he was downed twice by the 00' Olympic Silver medalist and 98' World Champion Sammie Henson, losing the spot. He quickly bounced back a week later with a Pan American title. In his last competition of the year, Cejudo took part of the Sunkist Open, where he lost in the second round.

On March 22, 2007, he captured a bronze medal at the World Cup. In April 7, he claimed his second US National title while compiling wins over collegiate and international standout Nick Simmons and two-time All-American Vic Moreno. On May 18, he earned his second Pan American title. Cejudo then made the US World Team after two straight wins over Matt Azevedo. Before the World Championships, he warmed up with a Pan American Games title. At the World's, he was taken out in the opening round by Uzbekistan's Erkin Tadzhimetov and placed 31st.

2008 
Cejudo started off the most successful year of his freestyle career in March 2, with a Pan American title. He failed to secure his third consecutive US National title after he was pinned by Matt Azevedo, not before defeating recent All-American Obe Blanc. At the US Olympic Team Trials, he started off by comfortably downing two opponents to make it to the best-of-three. There, he had a hard-fought series with 04' Olympic Silver medalist and defending Olympic Teamer Stephen Abas, whom he went 2–1 with, earning the US Olympic Team spot.

At the 2008 Summer Olympics, Cejudo opened up with a win over Radoslav Velikov, the 06' World Champion; after losing the first period 0–1, he bounced back with 3–2 and 4–3 periods. In the next round, he faced Besarion Gochashvili from Georgia; the same results as his opening bout popped up, after losing the first period 1–3, he came back with scores of 3–2 and 3–0 to defeat Gochashvili. He then wrestled Azerbaijan's Namig Sevdimov, whom he took out after once again losing the first period (3–5) and winning the next two (3–2, 4–3). In the finale, he met Tomohiro Matsunaga, a Japanese athlete who was coming fresh off an Asian title; he won the first period after scoring the biggest move and won the second period after a comfortable 3–0 score. This made Cejudo the youngest American to win Olympic Gold in wrestling history at age 21 (record was later broken by Kyle Snyder, 20, in 2016). He then took a break from his freestyle wrestling career.

2011–2012 
After announcing that he would try to make a second Olympic run in 2010, Cejudo made his comeback at the 2011 Beat the Streets charity event, where he beat Rasul Mashezov 2–0 and 4–3.

In his first tournament since his lay-off, Cejudo claimed a Sunkist Open title after compiling four victories, on October 28, 2011. On November 26, 2011, he earned a silver medal from the Henri Deglane Challenge, after being defeated in the finals by Ghenadie Tulbea.

At the 2012 US Olympic Team Trials, Cejudo downed Obe Blanc before being defeated by the top-seed Nick Simmons, failing to make his second US Olympic Team. After the Simmons match, Cejudo put his shoes in the middle of the mat, signaling his retirement from the sport.

Appearances post-retirement 
While already an undefeated MMA prospect, Cejudo made a brief return to the sport at the "Agon V: Iowa against the World" event by wrestling Tony Ramos (who would go on to win the US Open weeks later) on April 4, 2015, weeks after his win over Chris Cariaso at UFC 185. Despite riding an 8–2 lead, he was defeated by that year's World Team Member after he scored eight more points of his own, ending the match 8–10.

In June 2018, Cejudo was prestigiously inducted into the National Wrestling Hall of Fame as a Distinguished Member.

Soon after his exhibition match with Ramos, Cejudo flirted with the possibility of making a 2016 Olympic Run, however, his intentions never materialized.

Mixed martial arts career

Early career
On January 30, 2013, Cejudo announced on his Twitter page that he planned to begin training for a career in MMA. Despite wrestling at 121 pounds during his wrestling career, Cejudo fought at 135 pounds in his MMA debut. He defeated Michael Poe by TKO due to punches in his MMA debut on March 2, 2013, for the Arizona-based World Fighting Federation.

Over the next year, Cejudo amassed a record of 6–0 with three wins by TKO, one by submission, and two by decision. Prior to signing with the UFC, Cejudo was listed as the #1 ranked bantamweight prospect in the MMA Prospects Report 2013.

Ultimate Fighting Championship
On July 25, 2014, Cejudo signed with the UFC. He is the third Olympic gold medalist wrestler in company history, after Mark Schultz and Kevin Jackson. Cejudo was expected to face Scott Jorgensen on August 30, 2014, at UFC 177. However, due to medical issues on the day of the weigh-ins, Cejudo was forced out of the bout and the fight was subsequently canceled. In light of this, and his history of missing weight, president Dana White said Cejudo had to move up to bantamweight or leave the UFC.

In his eventual debut, Cejudo faced Dustin Kimura in a bantamweight bout on December 13, 2014, at UFC on Fox 13. Cejudo won the fight by unanimous decision.

Cejudo faced Chris Cariaso in a flyweight bout on March 14, 2015, at UFC 185. He won the fight by unanimous decision.

Cejudo faced Chico Camus on June 13, 2015, at UFC 188. He won the fight by unanimous decision.

Cejudo was briefly linked to a bout against former title challenger Joseph Benavidez on September 5, 2015, at UFC 191. However, the fight did not take place at the event. In turn, Cejudo faced Jussier Formiga on November 21, 2015, at The Ultimate Fighter Latin America 2 Finale. He won the fight by split decision. Brandon Moreno confirmed that he helped Cejudo train for this fight.

On September 16, 2015, Cejudo announced that he would refuse to fight in Nevada after the Nevada State Athletic Commission suspended and fined Nick Diaz following a failed drug test at UFC 182. Cejudo cited the NSAC's process in determining Diaz's guilt as the reason for the boycott. Despite the lack of change in NSAC procedure, Cejudo ended his Nevada boycott to face UFC Flyweight champion Demetrious Johnson on April 23, 2016, at UFC 197 for the Flyweight title. He lost the fight via TKO in the first round, being dropped with a variety of strikes.

In May 2016, the UFC announced that Cejudo would be one of the coaches, opposite Joseph Benavidez on The Ultimate Fighter 24. The pairing faced each other on December 3, 2016, at The Ultimate Fighter 24 Finale. Cejudo lost the back-and-forth fight via split decision.

Cejudo was expected to face Sergio Pettis on May 13, 2017, at UFC 211. However, on May 10, Cejudo pulled out of the fight with a hand injury and the bout was canceled.

Cejudo faced Wilson Reis on September 9, 2017, at UFC 215. He won the fight via TKO in the second round. This win also won Cejudo his first Performance of the Night bonus award.

A rescheduled fight with Pettis took place on December 2, 2017, at UFC 218. Cejudo won the fight by unanimous decision.

Double Champion
Two years after challenging for the Flyweight title, Cejudo faced Demetrious Johnson in a rematch for UFC Flyweight Championship title in the co-main event at UFC 227 on August 4, 2018. Cejudo went on to win the back-and-forth fight via split decision to become the UFC's second Flyweight champion and first Olympic gold medalist to capture UFC gold. This fight earned him the Fight of the Night award. 13 of 25 media outlets scored the bout in favor of Cejudo, while 12 scored it for Johnson.

In November 2018, Cejudo revealed that he had signed a six-fight contract with UFC.

In the first defense of his UFC Flyweight Championship, Cejudo was initially scheduled to face UFC Bantamweight champion T.J. Dillashaw on January 26, 2019, at UFC 233. However, after that pay-per-view event was canceled, the fight was moved a week earlier to headline UFC Fight Night 143 on January 19, 2019. It was the first title fight to showcase the new UFC legacy belt. Cejudo won the fight via TKO just 32 seconds into the first round to retain his title. The win also earned Cejudo his second Performance of the Night bonus award. On 9 April 2019, USADA announced that Dillashaw had tested positive for EPO in pre and post-fight screenings and had been suspended for two years.
Cejudo faced Marlon Moraes on June 8, 2019 at UFC 238 for the vacant UFC Bantamweight Championship. He won the fight via TKO in the third round. This win made Cejudo the fourth fighter to hold championships simultaneously in two weight divisions in UFC, and earned him the Performance of the Night award. Cejudo became inactive until 2020 due to a shoulder injury.

In December 2019, Cejudo agreed to relinquish the UFC Flyweight title in order to focus on the bantamweight division.

UFC Bantamweight Champion 
Cejudo faced Marlon Moraes on June 8, 2019 at UFC 238 for the vacant UFC Bantamweight Championship. He won the fight via TKO in the third round. This win made Cejudo the fourth fighter to hold championships simultaneously in two weight divisions in UFC, and earned him the Performance of the Night award. Cejudo became inactive until 2020 due to a shoulder injury. It was revealed later that Cejudo suffered a rolled ankle mere days before the fight, requiring therapy to even compete.

Cejudo was scheduled to face José Aldo on May 9, 2020 at UFC 250. However, Aldo pulled out on April 8 due to visa issues. Cejudo faced a replacement in Dominick Cruz on May 9, 2020 at UFC 249. He won the fight via technical knockout in the second round.

During the post-fight interview Cejudo announced his retirement from professional fighting. The announcement was met with some skepticism, as various UFC commentators and fighters stated their opinion that Cejudo was using the announcement as a contract negotiation ploy. On May 24, the UFC officially vacated the bantamweight title and removed Cejudo's name from their rankings, based on his retirement announcement.

Return from retirement
After nearly three years since his last bout, Cejudo is scheduled to face Aljamain Sterling on May 6, 2023 at UFC 288 for the UFC Bantamweight Championship.

Personal life
Cejudo and his wife Karolina have a daughter, America (born 2021).

Other ventures 
Cejudo made an appearance on the May 27, 2020 episode of AEW Dynamite alongside fellow MMA fighters Rashad Evans and Vitor Belfort to support Mike Tyson in confronting members of Chris Jericho's Inner Circle. Two months later, Cejudo confirmed he was in talks with AEW about potentially signing a contract, stating that he was also considering competing in amateur wrestling as well.

Cejudo, along with his manager Ali Abdelaziz, fellow fighters Justin Gaethje and Colby Covington, and UFC President Dana White, all appeared at a rally for President Donald Trump in September 2020.

Championships and achievements

Mixed martial arts 

Ultimate Fighting Championship
UFC Bantamweight Championship (One time)
One successful title defense
UFC Flyweight Championship (One time)
One successful title defense
Seventh multi-divisional champion in UFC history
Fourth simultaneous multi-divisional champion
Fight of the Night (One time) 
Performance of the Night (Three times) 
MMAjunkie
 2018 Upset of the Year vs. Demetrious Johnson
 2019 June Fight of the Month vs. Marlon Moraes
MMA Fighting
 2018 Upset of the Year vs. Demetrious Johnson
MMA Weekly
 2018 Upset of the Year vs. Demetrious Johnson
MMADNA.nl
2018 Upset of the Year

Freestyle wrestling 

2011
 Henri Deglane Challenge
 Sunkist Kids International Open

2008
 Summer Olympics (55 kg)
 Pan American Championships (55 kg)
 US Olympic Team Trials (55 kg)
 U.S Senior National Championship (55 kg)
John Smith Award winner

2007
 Pan American Games
 Pan American Championships
 US World Team Trials (55 kg)
 U.S Senior National Championship (55 kg)

2006
 Pan American Championships
 US World Team Trials (55 kg)
 U.S Senior National Championship (55 kg)

Mixed martial arts record

|-
|Win
|align=center|16–2
|Dominick Cruz
|TKO (knee and punches)
|UFC 249
|
|align=center|2
|align=center|4:58
|Jacksonville, Florida, United States
|
|-
|Win
|align=center|15–2
|Marlon Moraes
|TKO (punches)
|UFC 238 
|
|align=center|3
|align=center|4:51
|Chicago, Illinois, United States
|
|-
|Win
|align=center|14–2
|T.J. Dillashaw
|TKO (punches)
|UFC Fight Night: Cejudo vs. Dillashaw
|
|align=center|1
|align=center|0:32
|Brooklyn, New York, United States
|
|-
|Win
|align=center|13–2
|Demetrious Johnson
|Decision (split)
|UFC 227 
|
|align=center|5
|align=center|5:00
|Los Angeles, California, United States
| 
|-
|Win
|align=center|12–2
|Sergio Pettis
|Decision (unanimous)
|UFC 218
|
|align=center|3
|align=center|5:00
|Detroit, Michigan, United States
|
|-
|Win
|align=center|11–2
|Wilson Reis
|TKO (punches)
|UFC 215
|
|align=center|2
|align=center|0:25
|Edmonton, Alberta, Canada
|
|-
|Loss
|align=center|10–2
|Joseph Benavidez
|Decision (split)
|The Ultimate Fighter: Tournament of Champions Finale
|
|align=center|3
|align=center|5:00
|Las Vegas, Nevada, United States
|
|-
|Loss
|align=center|10–1
|Demetrious Johnson
|TKO (knees to the body)
|UFC 197
|
|align=center|1
|align=center|2:49
|Las Vegas, Nevada, United States
|
|-
| Win
| align=center | 10–0
| Jussier Formiga
| Decision (split)
| The Ultimate Fighter Latin America 2 Finale: Magny vs. Gastelum
| 
| align=center | 3
| align=center | 5:00
| Monterrey, Mexico
| 
|-
| Win
| align=center | 9–0
| Chico Camus
| Decision (unanimous)
| UFC 188
| 
| align=center | 3
| align=center | 5:00
| Mexico City, Mexico
|
|-
| Win
| align=center | 8–0
| Chris Cariaso
| Decision (unanimous)
| UFC 185
| 
| align=center | 3
| align=center | 5:00
| Dallas, Texas, United States
| 
|-
| Win
| align=center | 7–0
| Dustin Kimura
| Decision (unanimous)
| UFC on Fox: dos Santos vs. Miocic
| 
| align=center | 3
| align=center | 5:00
| Phoenix, Arizona, United States
| 
|-
| Win
| align=center | 6–0
|  Elias Garcia
| Decision (unanimous)
| Legacy FC 27
| 
| align=center | 3
| align=center | 5:00
| Houston, Texas, United States
| 
|-
| Win
| align=center | 5–0
| Ryan Hollis
| Decision (unanimous)
| Legacy FC 24
| 
| align=center | 3
| align=center | 5:00
| Dallas, Texas, United States
| 
|-
| Win
| align=center | 4–0
| Miguelito Marti
| TKO (punches)
| Gladiator Challenge: American Dream
| 
| align=center | 1
| align=center | 1:43
| Lincoln, California, United States
|
|-
| Win
| align=center | 3–0
| Anthony Sessions
| TKO (punches)
| WFF 10: Cejudo v Sessions
| 
| align=center | 1
| align=center | 4:23
| Chandler, Arizona, United States
| 
|-
| Win
| align=center | 2–0
| Sean Henry Barnett
| TKO (punches)
| Gladiator Challenge: Battleground
| 
| align=center | 1
| align=center | 4:55
| San Jacinto, California, United States
|
|-
| Win
| align=center | 1–0
| Michael Poe
| TKO (submission to punches)
| WFF MMA: Pascua Yaqui Fights 4
| 
| align=center | 1
| align=center | 1:25
| Tucson, Arizona, United States
|

Freestyle record

|-
! colspan="7"| Senior Freestyle Matches
|-
!  Res.
!  Record
!  Opponent
!  Score
!  Date
!  Event
!  Location 
|-
|Loss
|42–11
|align=left| Tony Ramos
|style="font-size:88%"|8–10
|style="font-size:88%"|April 4, 2015
|style="font-size:88%"|2015 Agon V: Iowa against the World
|style="text-align:left;font-size:88%;" |
 Iowa City, Iowa
|-
! style=background:white colspan=7 |
|-
|Loss
|42–10
|align=left| Nick Simmons
|style="font-size:88%"|0–3, 9–5, 2–5
|style="font-size:88%" rowspan=3|April 21, 2012
|style="font-size:88%" rowspan=3|2012 US Olympic Team Trials
|style="text-align:left;font-size:88%;" rowspan=3| Iowa City, Iowa
|-
|Win
|42–9
|align=left| Obe Blanc
|style="font-size:88%"|1–0, 2–0
|-
|Win
|41–9
|align=left| Earl Hall
|style="font-size:88%"|1–1, 5–3
|-
! style=background:white colspan=7 |
|-
|Loss
|40–9
|align=left| Ghenadie Tulbea
|style="font-size:88%"|1–3, 2–6
|style="font-size:88%" rowspan=3|November 26, 2011
|style="font-size:88%" rowspan=3|2011 Henri Deglane Challenge
|style="text-align:left;font-size:88%;" rowspan=3| Nice, France
|-
|Win
|40–8
|align=left| Rodrigo Rodriguez
|style="font-size:88%"|2–0, 6–0
|-
|Win
|39–8
|align=left| Chakir Ansari
|style="font-size:88%"|4–0, 2–2, 2–1
|-
! style=background:white colspan=7 |
|-
|Win
|38–8
|align=left| Danny Felix
|style="font-size:88%"|1–0, 1–0
|style="font-size:88%" rowspan=4|October 28, 2011
|style="font-size:88%" rowspan=4|2011 Sunkist International Open
|style="text-align:left;font-size:88%;" rowspan=4| Mesa, Arizona
|-
|Win
|37–8
|align=left| Jarrod Patterson
|style="font-size:88%"|4–0, 8–2
|-
|Win
|36–8
|align=left| Aso Palani
|style="font-size:88%"|2–0, 3–2
|-
|Win
|35–8
|align=left| Ben Kjar
|style="font-size:88%"|1–0, 1–0
|-
|Win
|34–8
|align=left| Rasul Mashezov
|style="font-size:88%"|2–0, 4–3
|style="font-size:88%"|May 5, 2011
|style="font-size:88%"|2011 Beat The Streets: USA vs. Russia
|style="text-align:left;font-size:88%;" |
 New York City, New York
|-
! style=background:white colspan=7 |
|-
|Win
|33–8
|align=left| Tomohiro Matsunaga
|style="font-size:88%"|2–2, 3–0
|style="font-size:88%" rowspan=4|August 19, 2008
|style="font-size:88%" rowspan=4|2008 Summer Olympics
|style="text-align:left;font-size:88%;" rowspan=4| Beijing, China
|-
|Win
|32–8
|align=left| Namig Sevdimov
|style="font-size:88%"|3–5, 3–2, 4–3
|-
|Win
|31–8
|align=left| Besarion Gochashvili
|style="font-size:88%"|1–3, 3–2, 3–0
|-
|Win
|30–8
|align=left| Radoslav Velikov
|style="font-size:88%"|0–1, 3–2, 4–3
|-
! style=background:white colspan=7 |
|-
|Win
|29–8
|align=left | Stephen Abas
|style="font-size:88%"|0–1, 3–0, 3–0
|style="font-size:88%" rowspan=5|June 15, 2008
|style="font-size:88%" rowspan=3|2008 US Olympic Team Trials
|style="text-align:left;font-size:88%;" rowspan=5| Las Vegas, Nevada
|-
|Loss
|28–8
|align=left | Stephen Abas
|style="font-size:88%"|0–2, 3–6
|-
|Win
|28–7
|align=left | Stephen Abas
|style="font-size:88%"|3–2, 4–0
|-
|Win
|27–7
|align=left| Danny Felix
|style="font-size:88%"|1–0, 1–0
|style="font-size:88%" rowspan=2|2008 US Olympic Team Trials Challenge Tournament
|-
|Win
|26–7
|align=left | Grant Nakamura
|style="font-size:88%"|5–0, 6–1
|-
! style=background:white colspan=7 |
|-
|Loss
|25–7
|align=left| Matt Azevedo
|style="font-size:88%"|Fall
|style="font-size:88%" rowspan=4|April 26, 2008
|style="font-size:88%" rowspan=4|2008 US Senior National Wrestling Championships
|style="text-align:left;font-size:88%;" rowspan=4| Las Vegas, Nevada
|-
|Win
|25–6
|align=left| Danny Felix
|style="font-size:88%"|1–0, 3–0
|-
|Win
|24–6
|align=left| Obe Blanc
|style="font-size:88%"|1–0, 3–0
|-
|Win
|23–6
|align=left| Kelly Martinez
|style="font-size:88%"|TF 7–0, 7–0
|-
! style=background:white colspan=7 |
|-
|Win
|22–6
|align=left| Andy Gonzalez
|style="font-size:88%"|Fall
|style="font-size:88%" rowspan=3|March 2, 2008
|style="font-size:88%" rowspan=3|2008 Pan American Wrestling Championships
|style="text-align:left;font-size:88%;" rowspan=3| Colorado, United States
|-
|Win
|21–6
|align=left| Vinicius Pedrosa
|style="font-size:88%"|TF 6–0, 7–0
|-
|Win
|20–6
|align=left| John Pineda
|style="font-size:88%"|2–1, 2–2
|-
! style=background:white colspan=7 |
|-
|Loss
|19–6
|align=left| Taghi Dadashi
|style="font-size:88%"|0–1, 0–4
| style="font-size:88%;"|September 17, 2007
| style="font-size:88%;"|2007 World Wrestling Championships
| style="text-align:left; font-size:88%;"| Baku, Azerbaijan
|-
! style=background:white colspan=7 | 
|-
|Win
|19–5
|align=left| Andy Moreno
|style="font-size:88%"|N/A
|style="font-size:88%"|August 14, 2007
|style="font-size:88%"|2007 Pan American Games
|style="text-align:left;font-size:88%;" |
 Rio de Janeiro, Brazil
|-
! style=background:white colspan=7 |
|-
|Win
|18–5
|align=left | Matt Azevedo
|style="font-size:88%"|4–1, 1–0
|style="font-size:88%" rowspan=2|June 10, 2007
|style="font-size:88%" rowspan=2|2007 US World Team Trials
|style="text-align:left;font-size:88%;" rowspan=2| Las Vegas, Nevada
|-
|Win
|17–5
|align=left | Matt Azevedo
|style="font-size:88%"|3–4, 3–3, 2–0
|-
! style=background:white colspan=7 | 
|-
|Win
|16–5
|align=left| Fredy Serrano
|style="font-size:88%"|N/A
|style="font-size:88%"|May 18, 2007
|style="font-size:88%"|2007 Pan American Championships
|style="text-align:left;font-size:88%;" |
 San Salvador, El Salvador
|-
! style=background:white colspan=7 |
|-
|Win
|15–5
|align=left| Nick Simmons
|style="font-size:88%"|4–4, 4–3, 5–0
|style="font-size:88%" rowspan=4|April 7, 2007
|style="font-size:88%" rowspan=4|2007 US Senior National Wrestling Championships
|style="text-align:left;font-size:88%;" rowspan=4| Las Vegas, Nevada
|-
|Win
|14–5
|align=left| Vic Moreno
|style="font-size:88%"|2–1, 1–1, 2–1
|-
|Win
|13–5
|align=left| Patrick McCaffery
|style="font-size:88%"|1–0, 1–0
|-
|Win
|12–5
|align=left| Michael Martinez
|style="font-size:88%"|1–0, 3–0
|-
! style=background:white colspan=7 |
|-
|Loss
|11–5
|align=left| Erkin Tadzhimetov
|style="font-size:88%"|1–4, 0–1
|style="font-size:88%" rowspan=2|October 14, 2006
|style="font-size:88%" rowspan=2|2006 Sunkist International Open
|style="text-align:left;font-size:88%;" rowspan=2| Arizona, United States
|-
|Win
|11–4
|align=left| Jamie Macari
|style="font-size:88%"|2–2, 6–0
|-
! style=background:white colspan=7 |
|-
|Loss
|10–4
|align=left | Sammie Henson
|style="font-size:88%"|0–2, 2–3
|style="font-size:88%" rowspan=4|June 28, 2006
|style="font-size:88%" rowspan=2|2006 US World Team Trials
|style="text-align:left;font-size:88%;" rowspan=4| Iowa, United States
|-
|Loss
|10–3
|align=left | Sammie Henson
|style="font-size:88%"|3–1, 1–3, 0–2
|-
|Win
|10–2
|align=left| Luke Eustice
|style="font-size:88%"|2–4, 3–2, 2–2
|style="font-size:88%" rowspan=2|2006 US World Team Trials Challenge Tournament
|-
|Win
|9–2
|align=left | Franklin Gómez
|style="font-size:88%"|0–1, 2–1, 3–1
|-
! style=background:white colspan=7 | 
|-
|Win
|8–2
|align=left| Luis Ibáñez
|style="font-size:88%"|N/A
|style="font-size:88%"|May 31, 2006
|style="font-size:88%"|2006 Pan American Championships
|style="text-align:left;font-size:88%;" |
 Rio de Janeiro, Brazil
|-
! style=background:white colspan=7 |
|-
|Win
|7–2
|align=left| Matt Azevedo
|style="font-size:88%"|0–1, 2–1, 4–2
|style="font-size:88%" rowspan=4|April 15, 2006
|style="font-size:88%" rowspan=4|2006 US Senior National Wrestling Championships
|style="text-align:left;font-size:88%;" rowspan=4| Las Vegas, Nevada
|-
|Win
|6–2
|align=left| Luke Eustice
|style="font-size:88%"|2–2, 3–1
|-
|Win
|5–2
|align=left| Mark Mcknight
|style="font-size:88%"|2–2, 1–1
|-
|Win
|4–2
|align=left| Grant Nakamura
|style="font-size:88%"|7–0, 2–1
|-
! style=background:white colspan=7 |
|-
|Win
|3–2
|align=left| Jeremy Mendoza
|style="font-size:88%"|1–0, 4–0
|style="font-size:88%" rowspan=5|October 23, 2005
|style="font-size:88%" rowspan=5|2005 Sunkist International Open
|style="text-align:left;font-size:88%;" rowspan=5| Arizona, United States
|-
|Loss
|2–2
|align=left| Matt Azevedo
|style="font-size:88%"|0–2, 1–0, 2–4
|-
|Loss
|2–1
|align=left| Luke Eustice
|style="font-size:88%"|0–3, 0–1
|-
|Win
|2–0
|align=left| Tanner Gardner
|style="font-size:88%"|1–6, 7–0, 5–3
|-
|Win
|1–0
|align=left| Jason Powell
|style="font-size:88%"|4–0, 3–4, 8–2
|-

See also

 List of current UFC fighters
 List of male mixed martial artists

References

External links
 
 

Bantamweight mixed martial artists
American male mixed martial artists
Mixed martial artists from California
American male sport wrestlers
Wrestlers at the 2007 Pan American Games
Wrestlers at the 2008 Summer Olympics
Olympic gold medalists for the United States in wrestling
American mixed martial artists of Mexican descent
Mixed martial artists utilizing freestyle wrestling
Mixed martial artists utilizing Shotokan
Mixed martial artists utilizing aikido
Sportspeople from Phoenix, Arizona
Sasuke (TV series) contestants
Living people
Flyweight mixed martial artists
Medalists at the 2008 Summer Olympics
Pan American Games gold medalists for the United States
Pan American Games medalists in wrestling
American male karateka
American aikidoka
Ultimate Fighting Championship male fighters
American Christians
Medalists at the 2007 Pan American Games
Grand Canyon University alumni
Ultimate Fighting Championship champions
1987 births